TER Midi Pyrénées was the regional rail network serving the Midi-Pyrénées region in southwest France. The centre of the network was Toulouse-Matabiau station. In 2017 it was merged into the new TER Occitanie.

Characteristics 
The network has 173 train stations and rail stops, as well as 241 road stops.
There is 1500 km of tracks, carrying 330 trains per day and about 30,000 passengers a day. Annual revenue in 2009 was €47.3 million.

Network

Rail

Road
 Rodez – Millau
 Millau – Saint-Affrique
 Villefranche-de-Rouergue – Decazeville
 Capdenac – Decazeville
 Souillac – Saint-Denis-lès-Martel
 Montauban – Albi
 Cahors – Figeac – Capdenac
 Cahors – Fumel – Monsempron-Libos
 Mazamet – Saint-Pons-de-Thomières
 Castelnaudary – Revel – Sorèze
 Boussens – Saint-Girons – Aulus-les-Bains – Guzet
 Lourdes – Argelès-Gazost – Pierrefitte-Nestalas – Cauterets
 Pierrefitte-Nestalas – Luz-Saint-Sauveur – Barèges
 Tarbes – Lannemezan – Arreau – Saint-Lary-Soulan – Piau-Engaly
 Tarbes – Bagnères-de-Bigorre – La Mongie
 Tarbes – Mont-de-Marsan – Dax
 Tarbes – Miélan – Auch
 Auch – Fleurance – Lectoure – Agen
 Muret – Longages – Saint-Sulpice-sur-Lèze

Rolling stock

Multiple units
 SNCF Class Z 7300
 SNCF Class Z 21500
 SNCF Class X 2100
 SNCF Class X 72500
 SNCF Class X 73500
 SNCF Class B 81500  Also called BGC B 81500

Locomotives
 SNCF Class BB 7200
 SNCF Class BB 8500
 SNCF Class BB 9300
 SNCF Class BB 67400

Structures 

 Viaduc du Viaur

See also 
SNCF
Transport express régional
Réseau Ferré de France
List of SNCF stations in Midi-Pyrénées
Midi-Pyrénées

External links
 Official Website
 Transports in Midi-Pyrénées